Ceren is a common feminine Turkish given name. In Turkish, "Ceren" means "baby gazelle."

It is also an alternate spelling of the popular Welsh name Seren, meaning "star."

Given name
 Ceren Alkan (born 1990), Turkish ice hockey player
 Ceren Demirçelen (born 1992), Turkish handball player
 Ceren Kestirengöz (born 1993), Turkish volleyball player
 Ceren Nurlu (born 1992), Turkish footballer
 Ceren Sarper (born 1990), Turkish basketball player
 Fatma Ceren Necipoğlu (1972–2009), Turkish harpist
 Ceren Kaya (1994) Architect
 Özlem Ceren Dursun (born 2003), Turkish cross-country skier

Surname
 Darwin Ceren (born 1989), Salvadoran footballer
 Omri Ceren, American political blogger
 Óscar Céren (born 1991), Salvadoran footballer
 Salvador Sánchez Cerén (born 1944), Salvadoran leftist politician and former teacher

Other uses
 Celal ile Ceren, 2013 Turkish romantic comedy film
 Joya de Cerén, archaeological site

Given names
Turkish-language surnames
Turkish feminine given names